The Liberal Party (Jiyūtō) was a political party in Japan.

History
The Liberal Party was established in mid-1903 as a breakaway from Rikken Seiyūkai by a group of around 20 National Diet members opposed to co-operation with Prime Minister Katsura Tarō. It sought to bring back the ideals of the original Liberal Party, but suffered from the widespread suspicion that it was a tool of Katsura's.

In December 1905 it merged with the Kōshin Club and Teikokutō to form the Daidō Club (1905–10).

References

Defunct political parties in Japan
Political parties established in 1903
1903 establishments in Japan
Political parties disestablished in 1905
1905 disestablishments in Japan